Fettspielen was a website that hosts free Flash-based browser games and  was founded in May 2008 by David An, CEO of Rumble Media GmbH which is a startup company, and is part of Holtzbrink Ventures. The company is located in Karlsruhe, Germany.

The site offers three new games per day and 83% of its audience is located in Germany. Fettspielen also had a sister-site called GirlsandGames.de

Games
The hosted flash games are sorted in ten genres: Action, Adventure, Sports, Skills, Racing, Girls, Brain & Puzzle, Card & Board and Multiplayer.
Several games also use an API to integrate the highscore-system of Fettspielen into their code.

Features
The site is free, and creating an account is optional. High scores are recorded for registered users, and users are given profile badges for activity on the site, e.g. commenting a game or having a highscore, and are able to gain ranks.

References

External links
Fettspielen Official Website
PCH FrontPage Win Game

Browser-based game websites
Internet properties established in 2008
Companies based in Baden-Württemberg
Gaming websites